In animal rights and welfare, open rescue is a direct action of rescue practiced by activists. Open rescue involves rescuing animals in pain and suffering, giving the rescued animals veterinary treatment and long-term care, documenting the living conditions, and ultimately publicly releasing the rescue and documentation.

Open rescue's public nature contrasts with clandestine animal rights activism. Open rescue activists typically publish their full identities. Open rescue is nonviolent towards humans and other animals, although some groups practice property damage.

History

Beginnings 
The open rescue method was largely developed by Animal Liberation Victoria (ALV) Rescue Team, based in Melbourne. Inspired by satyagraha, the method and philosophy used by Mahatma Gandhi in the struggle for independence for India, the ALV developed this method in the 1980s and has since been conducting investigations and open rescue operations, actions which reportedly have been well received by the public. At one point an Australian MP joined in the rescue operation of factory farmed piglets.

While not called open rescue, several other activist groups began engaging in activities similar to open rescue around the same time. People for the Ethical Treatment of Animals rescued several monkeys in 1981 from a lab in Silver Spring, Maryland and sparked discussion in The Washington Post.

Introduction to United States 
In 1999, Patty Mark of the ALV presented open rescue at United Poultry Concern's Direct Action for Animals Conference. Displaying the positive results of the open rescue actions in Australia and by comparing videos from an open rescue action and a clandestine action, she managed to convince a number of people of the usefulness of open rescue both on the grounds of compassions for animals and on the grounds of the reception by the general public, opening for the open rescue method on the international arena.

Soon after this, Compassionate Action for Animals (US) adopted the method, and other organizations followed. Activist Adam Durand with Compassionate Consumers conducted an open rescues at a Wegmans' egg farm in 2004. The Animal Protection and Rescue League conducted an open rescue and investigation at a Hudson Valley foie gras farm in 2011.

U.S. revival and international growth 
In the United States, open rescue became less common and came to a halt for ten years in the mid-2000s until Direct Action Everywhere released an investigation of a "Certified Humane" cage-free Whole Foods egg supplier in January 2015. There have since been over a dozen open rescues in several different locations in North America.

Direct Action Everywhere's open rescues in The New York Times, Wall Street Journal, and elsewhere have put pressure on several Whole Foods suppliers. A DxE investigation at a cage-free Costco egg supplier raised questions about an industry-wide shift in 2016 toward cage-free eggs. DxE centers its investigations around "humanewashing," or the alleged attempt by animal food companies to falsely market products as humane. In 2017, DxE sued Whole Foods turkey supplier Diestel Turkey Ranch under California's false advertising laws.

Currently, openrescue.org, a network for organisations practising open rescue, lists 18 different open rescue organisations, with varying level of activity, in five different countries on three continents - Australia and New Zealand (Oceania), Austria, Germany, The Czech Republic and Sweden (Europe) and United States (North America). A number of organizations, including Animal Liberation Victoria, Direct Action Everywhere, Tomma burar, Tierretter.de, VGT, and Animal Rights have begun coordinating an "international open rescue day" on March 5 launched on the website openrescues.com.

Criminality
Some practitioners of open rescue claim to not be guilty of any crime, claiming to have acted in defense of others, especially if the rescued animals have not been kept in accordance with laws regulating animal husbandry. Similarly, others cite the disregard of the owner's violations of such laws as sufficient justification, and point out the hypocrisy of the strict enforcement of the law against open rescue activists.

Majja Carlsson of Räddningstjänsten The Rescue Service, a Swedish open rescue organisation, was one of four activists that rescued 120 hens in the largest open rescue operation to date. In her description of the action, she writes the following (translated from Swedish):

Quite possibly legal ramifications will follow this action. Naturally, I realize that some will label this as a crime even though I disagree with them. It is sad that we are the ones considered criminals in this society, and not the egg industry which has in fact violated the Swedish Animal Protection Act for over fifteen years. That the law intended to protect the animals is widely ignored while crimes against the right of ownership are seen as serious offences.

Similarly, Räddningstjänsten writes in a comment to the legal proceedings that followed the action (translated from Swedish) "We acted and saved 120 individuals from unnecessary suffering and certain premature death. [...] The real crimes are not committed by us, but by the animal industry."

In the United States, courts have often sided with prosecutors in the suppression of evidence of animal cruelty exposed by animal rights activists in cases involving animal liberation and open rescues, as it makes it easier for the defendants to be prosecuted as thieves and terrorists under the Animal Enterprise Protection Act. According to The Intercept's Natasha Lennard, this is one of the legacies of the Green Scare, when the government, at the behest of pharmaceutical and agricultural corporations, aggressively prosecuted animal rights activists as so-called "eco-terrorists".

Arguments for open rescue

Open rescue "puts a face on animal liberation". By being open, proponents claim that they get a more positive response from the media and the general population, and that by not wearing masks they reduce the distance between themselves and the public, they become a normal everyday person whom the public can identify with and not an abstract masked "terrorist". Being open removes or tones down the militant edge of direct actions.

Open rescue proponents also claim that their method of operation is conducive to their compassion for the rescued animals. One of the things reportedly shown by the video comparison at the aforementioned United Poultry Concern's forum on Direct Actions was that the open rescue activist displayed more compassion and care for the animals compared to the clandestine activists (which is not to say that the clandestine activists did not display compassion and care). Whether this is due to that the operations are unmasked, that the operations are open or some other quality is still open for argument.

Criticism

One can divide the criticism against open rescue into two general categories: Criticism against open rescue as a method of direct action, which often comes from other practitioners of direct action, and criticism of the use of direct action, which can come both from other animal rights activists and from outside the animal rights movements.

Criticism against open rescue as a method of direct action
It has been argued that because open rescue virtually guarantees that the activists will be found and convicted due to the publication of their identities, open rescue can be construed as a more resource-demanding method compared to clandestine methods. According to this, open rescue would allegedly require more money, as the resulting convictions following the actions means that fines have to be paid and damages have to be compensated. In addition, more manpower could be needed as the activists could be imprisoned. This is seen as a waste of resources and people which could be used to rescue even more animals. However, all these claims have resulted to be wrong in practice. In part because of the sympathies that open rescuers gain from the public, legal actions against them are uncommon, even if the identities of the rescuers is known.

It is also argued that open rescue is not a reasonable alternative for everyone. Some activists are on probation, and being sentenced for another crime could mean that their previous sentences would be transformed to jail time.

It might be argued as well that some activists have or will have careers which require the lack of a criminal record, careers or dreams which would effectively be over if they used the open rescue method, and regardless for most professions and careers a criminal record - in particular an extensive one - will be a hindrance both in regards to getting employed and getting promotions. This, however, would apply in the case of any kind of illegal action.

Defending open rescues over rescues in which the identity of the rescuers is hidden

Defenders of open rescues claim that when activists do not hide their faces their actions are much better received by the public, thus being able to be much more successful in achieving their aim of questioning the public's speciesist attitudes.

Some who are not involved in animal rights activism but sympathise with the goal of animal rights may have other reasons to defend open rescues, though this is extremely uncommon among animal rights activists, and those involved in open rescues do not support them. Some people consider direct actions to be counter-productive. While they may sympathise with the activists and what they wish to achieve, they think that the groups should abide the laws and by extension the democratic system that they live in. It is argued that the activists have a democratic and civic responsibility to operate within the confines of the law and that to do otherwise would be undemocratic, possibly even tyrannical. A common response to this criticism, made by both proponents of open rescues and other kinds of rescues, is that the argument suffers a fundamental flaw: We live in a democracy, but it is a democracy of man, for man, by man. The laws are written by humans for humans, making it an androcentric system which does not represent animals. If our system of governance is looked at from an interspecies perspective, it is something to be likened to apartheid rather than a full democracy, with humans taking the place of whites.

See also
Animal Outlook (formerly Compassion Over Killing) - an organisation which practices open rescue
Civil disobedience
Direct Action Everywhere - an international grassroots network of animal rights activists which practices open rescue
Ecotage
Satyagraha
Veganism
Vegetarianism

References

External links
 Open Rescue International - a coalition of animal activist groups, organizations and networks participating in open rescue
openrescue.org - a network of open rescue organisations
nzopenrescue.org.nz - New Zealand Open Rescue
OpenRescue.net - Open Rescues carried out by Animal Equality
RescateAbierto.org - Spanish Open Rescue Team by Animal Equality (in Spanish)
rescate-abierto.org - Spanish Open Rescue Team by Equanimal (in Spanish)
Michal Kolesár, open rescue activist
Rescue at Oakland Slaughterhouse Shows New, Potent Tactics of Growing Animal Rights Movement. The Intercept. November 1, 2017.

Animal rights movement
Civil disobedience